EFDC_Explorer (EE) is a Windows-based GUI for pre- and post processing of the Environmental Fluid Dynamics Code (EFDC). The program is developed and supported by the engineering company DSI. EFDC_Explorer is designed to support model set-up, grid generation (Cartesian and orthogonal curvilinear), testing, calibration, and visualization of model results (Craig, 2020).  EE supports hydrodynamics, sediment/toxics transport, particle tracking and the coupled water quality model HEM3D.

EFDC was originally developed at Virginia Institute of Marine Science (Hamrick, 1992). It is open-source software and is a widely used, EPA accepted model.  DSI continues to develop EFDC using the name EFDC+. Enhancements include adding multithreading capability and more recently full parallel computing with MPI (Message Passing Interface). EFDC_Explorer is part of the EE Modeling System (EEMS) which includes EFDC+, the enhanced version of EFDC, and CVLGrid, a curvilinear Cartesian grid generator.

EFDC+/EFDC_Explorer Functions
EFDC Pre- & Post-Processing
2D & 3D Animations
Model Results Visualization
Data vs. Model Comparisons
Real-time data processing and simulation

Simulation of: 

Hydrodynamics
Sediment transport
Toxics transport
Water quality
Shellfish farms
Wave impacts and wind wave generation
Lagrangian Particle Tracking
Ice Formation and Melt
Marine Hydrokinetics
Habitat analysis using Instream Flow Incremental Method
Propeller Wash

Example applications
EFDC_Explorer has been in distribution since 2003, and is now being used in over 60 countries.

Newtown Creek, New York City: Newtown Creek was proposed as a potential Superfund site in September 2009, and received that designation on September 27, 2010. EFDC and EFDC_Explorer are being used to support the remedial investigation and feasibility study to prepare for environmental remediation. 

Ohio River, USA: "This model of the Ohio River was designed to assist in a storm impacts study for Cincinnati City. The study related to the evaluation of combined sewer overflows (CSOs) and other wet weather impacts on the water quality on the Ohio River, and to evaluate resulting benefits from certain abatement scenarios."

Lake Washington, WA, "DSI has developed the Lake Washington Real-time Temperature Simulation as an example of a real-time data and modeling facility to serve the scientific community in Seattle, Washington, US."

References

External links 
 Environmental Protection Agency EFDC 
 EFDC_Explorer Modeling System Website
 EFDC_Explorer Knowledge Base
EFDC+ Theory Guide
Lake Washington Real-time Temperature Simulation

Simulation software